The largest and deepest fissure in the cerebellum is named the horizontal fissure (or horizontal sulcus).

It commences in front of the pons, and passes horizontally around the free margin of the hemisphere to the middle line behind, and divides the cerebellum into an upper and a lower portion.

Additional images

References

External links

 NIF Search - Horizontal Fissure via the Neuroscience Information Framework

Cerebellum